The Yellowknives, Yellow Knives, Copper Indians, Red Knives or T'atsaot'ine (Dogrib: T'satsąot'ınę) are indigenous peoples of Canada, one of the five main groups of the First Nations Dene who live in the Northwest Territories of Canada. The name, which is also the source for the later community of Yellowknife, derives from the colour of the tools made from copper deposits.

History
The historic Yellowknives lived north and northeast of the Great Slave Lake (Tinde'e - "Great Lake") around the Yellowknife River and Yellowknife Bay (Weledeh Cho - "Inconnu River") and northward along the Coppermine River, northeast to the Back River (Thlewechodyeth or Thlew-ee-choh-desseth - "Great Fish River") and east to the Thelon River (or Akilinik). They used the major rivers of their traditional land as routes for travel and trade as far east as Hudson Bay, where early European explorers such as Samuel Hearne encountered them in the 1770s.

The Yellowknives helped lead Hearne through the Canadian Arctic tundra from Hudson Bay to the Arctic Ocean in search of the legendary copper deposits that the Yellowknives, or 'Copper Indians', had a hand in mining and trading for tools. Later European explorers who encountered and traded with Copper Indians marked on their maps the 'Yellowknife River,' which drains into Great Slave Lake from headwaters originating near the headwaters of the Coppermine River, a traditional travel corridor. In the early 1800s and 1900s, the Yellowknives were the largest and most powerful tribe in the geographic area.

The Yellowknives and the Tłı̨chǫ (Dogrib), who also lived on the north shores of Great Slave Lake, were ancestral enemies. In the 1830s it was reported that the Dogrib almost wiped out the Yellowknives, the remnants of which - although opinions vary - either scattered south of Great Slave Lake or inter-married with the Dogrib. Following the discovery of gold in the Yellowknife area, a great mix of Dogrib, Chipewyan, and remnant Yellowknife members congregated and settled in the community or within the traditional villages of Dettah or Trout Rock. With government funding, the Dene village of Ndilǫ was developed in the mid 1950s on the tip of Latham Island (the southern point of Yellowknife's Old Town). The Yellowknives Dene First Nation was formed in 1991 (formerly known as Yellowknife B Band) following the collapse of a territorial-wide comprehensive land claim negotiation. They currently negotiate a land claim settlement for their lands as part of the Akaitcho Land Claim Process.

Another organized Dene group has come forward claiming to be direct descendants of the historic 'Yellowknife Indian' tribes, and asserting independence from the mixed Dogrib-Chipewyan Yellowknives Dene First Nation. Considered a distinct people, they are still seeking government recognition today under Treaty 8.

Chief Snuff of the Yellowknives signed Treaty 8 in 1899. Chief Snuff lived on the south shore and east arm of Great Slave Lake. The people who lived on the Taltson River were dubbed the Rocher River People in the 1920s. Chief Snuff had a cabin located about ten miles from Rocher River on a little piece of land beside the water, called Snuff Channel, connected to the Taltson River.

The Yellowknives continued to reside in this area until the early 1960s, when they were forced to relocate after their schoolhouse was burned down in a fire. Shortly after, the Taltson River hydro dam was built. The last chief of the Rocher River Yellowknives was Chief Pierre Frise in the 1960s; he was strongly opposed to the building of the Taltson River dam. During this point the original Yellowknives were dispersed to Fort Resolution, Yellowknife, and other areas of Canada.

Yellowknives First Nations 
All First Nations with Yellowknives descendants are organized in the Akaitcho Treaty 8 Tribal Corporation and in the Akaitcho Territory Government.
 Yellowknives Dene First Nation (they identify as Weledeh Yellowknives Dene, aka Inconnu River People): many are descendants of the Wuledehot'in regional group of the neighbouring Tłı̨chǫ. Communities: Dettah, Ndilǫ, and Yellowknife. The Dettah-Ndilǫ-Tłįchǫ Yatıì, a dialect spoken in the communities of Dettah and Ndilǫ, developed from intermarriage between Yellowknives and Tłı̨chǫ peoples)
 Deninu K'ue First Nation (Deninu Kue (pronounced "Deneh-noo-kweh"), means "moose island"). It is a settlement corporation in the South Slave Region of the Northwest Territories. The community is situated at the mouth of the Slave River, on the shore of Great Slave Lake, Deninu K'ue or Dene Nu Kwen are/were called Chipewyan (Denesuline) and Yellowknives, which came to Fort Resolution to trade their furs.
 Lutsel K'e Dene First Nation (Lutselk'e, pronounced "Loot-sel-kay") also spelled Lutsel K'e ("place of the Lutsel", the cisco, a type of small fish), is a designated authority in the North Slave Region of the Northwest Territories. The community is located on the south shore near the eastern end of Great Slave Lake and until 1 July 1992, it was known as Snowdrift. The First Nation was formerly known as the Snowdrift Band. The most northerly Chipewyan First Nation, once nomadic caribou hunters, this band included some Chipewyan and Yellowknives who settled permanently at the trading post established in 1925 by the Hudson's Bay Company near today's Łutselk'e. In 1954 they moved to the community of Łutselk'e. Main languages in the community are Chipewyan and English.

Notes

Further reading

 Canada. Yellowknives Dene First Nations Treaty & Entitlement: Important Times for Yellowknives About Treaty. --. [Yellowknife, N.W.T.: Govt. of the N.W.T.], 1993.
 Canada. Yellowknife 1993: Aboriginal Peoples in the Capital of the NWT : Final Report. --. [Yellowknife, N.W.T.: Govt. of the N.W.T.], 1993.
 Fumoleau, René. Denendeh: A Dene Celebration. Yellowknife, Denendeh, N.W.T.: Dene Nation, 1984. 
 Northwest Territories. Dene Kede = Dene Zhatie = Dene Náoweré Dahk'é : Education, a Dene Perspective. Yellowknife, N.W.T.: Education, Culture and Employment, Education Development Branch, 1993.
 Yellowknives Dene First Nation Elders Advisory Council. Weledeh Yellowknives Dene: A Traditional Knowledge Study of Ek'ati. [Northwest Territories]: Yellowknives Dene First Nation, 1997.

External links
Catholic Encyclopedia article
Weledeh Yellowknives Dene - A History

Dene peoples
First Nations in the Northwest Territories